Khotey Sikkey is a crime television series that aired on Sony Entertainment Television. It premiered on 28 January 2011. The show revolves around an unlikely gang of five privileged youngsters and one stubborn cop. The group researches the crime activities in Mumbai. The series produced by Yas Raj Films.

Cast
Vikas Kumar as Senior Inspector Damodar Deshmukh
Hasan Zaidi as Mohit Kishenchandani
Mark Farokh Parakh as Ayush Khetarpal
Puru Chibber as Hameer Rizvi
Sukhmani Sadana as Uttara Bakshi
Dilkhush Reporter as Dilnaz Shroff
Adhyay Bakshi as Inspector Patil
Amit Jain as Vivaan Bakshi
Sumona Chakravarti as Anjali
Nivaan Sen as Amol 
 Olivier Lafont as Commodore Farokh

References

Sony Entertainment Television original programming
Indian crime television series
2011 Indian television series debuts
2011 Indian television series endings
Fictional portrayals of the Maharashtra Police